Gaston, Baron Roelants (born 5 February 1937), is a Belgian former elite steeplechaser and cross country runner. He won the 1962 European and 1964 Olympic titles in the 3000 m steeplechase and twice broke the world record.

Biography

Roelants finished fourth in the steeplechase at the 1960 Olympics, and after winning a bronze medal at the 1966 European Championships he successfully turned to longer distances, setting world records in the 20 km (58 minutes 6.2 seconds) and in the 1 hour race (20,664 m) that year. In 1972 he improved those records to 57 minutes 44.4 seconds and 20,878 meters. He won a silver (1969) and a bronze (1974) medal in European marathon races.  He was ranked the world's best steeplechaser five times, in 1962–1965 and 1967.

Roelants also won four international cross country titles (1962, 1967, 1969 and 1972) with three second places between 1960 and 1975. His long career continued into his 40s. Later he won five world titles in the masters category and held the masters world record in the steeplechase for 27 years.

A major Belgian road race is named after Roelants.

References

1937 births
Living people
People from Bierbeek
Sportspeople from Flemish Brabant
Belgian male middle-distance runners
Belgian male long-distance runners
Belgian male marathon runners
Belgian male steeplechase runners
Olympic male marathon runners
Olympic male steeplechase runners
Olympic athletes of Belgium
Olympic gold medalists for Belgium
Olympic gold medalists in athletics (track and field)
Athletes (track and field) at the 1960 Summer Olympics
Athletes (track and field) at the 1964 Summer Olympics
Athletes (track and field) at the 1968 Summer Olympics
Athletes (track and field) at the 1972 Summer Olympics
Medalists at the 1964 Summer Olympics
International Cross Country Championships winners
European Athletics Championships medalists
Japan Championships in Athletics winners
Belgian Athletics Championships winners
World record setters in athletics (track and field)
Barons of Belgium